George James Cosmo Douglas (1889 - 7 January 1973) was a Scottish Episcopalian priest during the 20th century.

Douglas was born in 1889. He was educated at the University of Edinburgh and ordained in 1914.

He began his ordained ministry with a curacy at St Paul's Cathedral, Dundee, after which he was a chaplain to the British Armed Forces. After the war he became the priest in charge of St Andrew's and St George's Rosyth and then the rector of St John the Baptist's Dundee. He became Provost of the Cathedral of the Isles in 1949 and then, concurrently, Dean of Argyll and The Isles - posts he held until his death on 7 January 1973.

He is buried in the churchyard of the Cathedral of the Isles.

References

1889 births
1973 deaths
Alumni of the University of Edinburgh
Scottish Episcopalian clergy
Provosts of the Cathedral of The Isles
Deans of Argyll and The Isles
Scottish military chaplains
World War I chaplains